Agyneta insulana is a species of sheet weaver found in Sakhalin and the Kuril Islands. It was described by Tanasevitch in 2000.

References

insulana
Spiders described in 2000
Spiders of Russia